The British Columbia Patriotic and Educational Picture Service was a British Columbia provincial government department founded in April 1920 by the Liberal government of Premier John Oliver. It was created under legislation entitled "The Moving Pictures Act Amendment Act" of 1920, as proposed by Oliver's Attorney-General, J. W. de B. Farris. The intended role of the picture service was to produce, acquire, distribute, and exhibit motion pictures promoting British Columbia and Canada, and by so doing counter the nationalistic American content in Hollywood films. The legislation required that all BC theatres exhibit up to 15 minutes of the service's films as part of each screening. Resistance to this requirement, coupled with the insertion of political propaganda into its films, made the picture service highly controversial, and it ceased production in 1922–23.

Organization and film production 
The appointed director was Dr. A. Richard Baker (1872-1941), a Vancouver dentist, who was also chairman of the provincial Game Conservation Board. The department's offices were in the old Vancouver Courthouse on Georgia Street, which currently (2021) houses the Vancouver Art Gallery.

Unlike the Ontario Motion Picture Bureau (founded in 1917), which until 1923 acquired all its films from outside producers, the BC picture service had an in-house production capability from its inception. Most of the films distributed were produced by Vancouver filmmaker Arthur D. Kean, including a number of pre-1920 films that he had produced for his own company (Kean's Canada Films), or under contract to the Game Conservation Board. Kean received a staff salary through the Game Board, and the picture service paid him by the foot for film he shot, processed and printed. A smaller number of titles were purchased from Pathescope of Canada.

Political scandal and accusations of malfeasance led to a Royal Commission of Inquiry into A. R. Baker's activities in both departments in 1921–22. The inquiry exonerated Baker, but he resigned anyway. The picture service continued to function in a reduced capacity under the direction of BC Film Censor Walter Hepburn. In-house production stopped completely in 1923, although the legislation creating the service remained on the books for several years. The last known PEPS-related film was The Cariboo Road (1926), produced for the government under the supervision of Baker and only shown publicly once.

May Watkis and "directress" story 

A misleading story has been circulating for decades about May Gowen Watkis (1879-1940), a clerk who served as Dr. Baker's administrative assistant from July 1920 to July 1921. In a poorly-researched 1921 article in MacLean’s Magazine, writer Edith M. Cuppage described Watkis as the “directress” of the picture service and implied that she was responsible for the production of its films. Unfortunately, Canadian film historians, taking the MacLean’s story at face value, have promulgated and elaborated on this misinformation, crediting Watkis as the producer of Beautiful Ocean Falls (Pathescope, 1919) and other unspecified films. As a result, Watkis has been erroneously celebrated as a pioneer female Canadian filmmaker. Recent scholarship has endeavored to correct the misinformation about Watkis and her role at PEPS. Newspaper coverage from the period makes it quite clear that Baker was the one and only director of the service, and that Kean was the only filmmaker on staff.

Select filmography 
Except where noted as "extant," these titles—like virtually all of the PEPS films—are considered lost.

Whaling: British Columbia's Least Known and Most Romantic Industry (1916-19?). Extant.†
The Story of Copper or Anyox, Story of Copper (Winter 1918–19).†
Beautiful Ocean Falls (ca. 1919).  Pathescope of Canada. Extant.
Travel Tour of the West Coast of Vancouver Island (1919?). Pathescope of Canada. Extant.
Glorious Garibaldi Park (1920).
The Land of Wonders Review (1920)
Pacific Great Eastern Railway (1920–21).
Profits from Oysters, aka Oyster Cultivation in British Columbia (1920). PEPS short about the oyster industry, highlighting its employment of Asian labourers; used as political propaganda against Opposition leader W. J. Bowser in the 1920 BC provincial election.
Mother's Pensions Act (1920).
Board of Trade Excursion (1921).
Nelson, Queen of the Kootenays (1922). With footage of the Trail smelter and Bonnington Falls.

† = Films made independently by Kean before 1920, and later picked up for distribution by PEPS.

References 

Cinema of British Columbia
Documentary film organizations
Film distributors of Canada
Film organizations in Canada
Film production companies of Canada
Government agencies established in 1920
State-owned film companies